The Black Seeds are a reggae inspired musical group from Wellington, New Zealand. Their rocksteady song "One By One" became an international hit when it was played in top ranked TV series Breaking Bad. Their music is a mixture of big beat funk, dub, afro music, pop, rock, soul, and roots reggae/ragga.

Formed in 1998, The Black Seeds perform with eight members, with instruments including vocals, guitar, saxophone, trumpet, bass, drums, bongos, keyboard and wood block. Black Seeds first album, Keep on Pushing, was released 2001 following a number of live performances. Already very successful in New Zealand and popular in Australia, Europe and North & South America, their third album Into the Dojo (2007) introduced Black Seeds internationally. They have released five albums, a live album, and two remix albums. They have two double-platinum selling albums in New Zealand, and successful European album releases through the German-based Sonar Kollektiv label. In 2011 Black Seeds was described by Rolling Stone as "The Best Reggae band in the world right now". 

Lead singer Barnaby Weir, the son of veteran radio broadcaster Dick Weir, is also associated with the side-projects Fly My Pretties and Flash Harry. Former band member Bret McKenzie is also a member of international award-winning comedy duo Flight of the Conchords, as well as playing the role of Figwit the elf in Peter Jackson's The Lord of the Rings. 

The band released their 6th studio album "Fabric" in early September 2017.

Their song "One by One" was used in AMC's Breaking Bad Season 2 Episode, "4 Days Out" and also appears on the series' official soundtrack.

Discography 

 Keep On Pushing LP (2001)
 On the Sun (2004)
 Into the Dojo (2006)
 Solid Ground (2008)
 The Black Seeds Live – Vol 1 (2009)
 Specials: remixes and versions off Solid Ground (2010)
 Dust And Dirt (2012)
 Fabric (2017)
 Love & Fire (2022)

References

External links

 
 The Black Seeds – Amplifier.co.nz
 Black Seeds Bio – Muzic.net.nz

New Zealand reggae musical groups
Sonar Kollektiv artists
Easy Star Records artists
Pacific reggae